The Weber House was a historic house on Elm Street in Russell, Arkansas. It was a single-story wood-frame structure, with a front gable roof, novelty siding, and a foundation of brick piers.  The roof extended across a deep porch in front, with decorative knee brackets.  Built in 1933, it was a fine example of late Craftsman architecture in Russell.

The house was listed on the National Register of Historic Places in 1991. It has been listed as destroyed in the Arkansas Historic Preservation Program database.

See also
National Register of Historic Places listings in White County, Arkansas

References

Houses on the National Register of Historic Places in Arkansas
Houses completed in 1933
Houses in White County, Arkansas
National Register of Historic Places in White County, Arkansas
1933 establishments in Arkansas
American Craftsman architecture in Arkansas
Bungalow architecture in Arkansas